The Huey P. Long House on Forest Avenue in Shreveport, Louisiana was built in 1926.  It was listed on the National Register of Historic Places (NRHP) in 1991.

It is a two-story Spanish Colonial Revival-style house made with stucco over hollow tile.  It is significant for its association with politician Huey P. Long, who with his family moved into the house in 1926.  He moved to Baton Rouge in 1928 when he became governor of the state, but the house remained in the family until the 1970s.  It is the only house which Long had constructed for himself and in which he took much personal interest.

See also
Huey P. Long Mansion, in New Orleans, also NRHP-listed
Huey P. Long House (Laurel St., Shreveport, Louisiana), destroyed, formerly NRHP-listed
National Register of Historic Places listings in Caddo Parish, Louisiana

References

Houses on the National Register of Historic Places in Louisiana
Houses in Shreveport, Louisiana
National Register of Historic Places in Caddo Parish, Louisiana
Huey Long